The Wasserflue is a mountain of the Jura, located north of Erlinsbach in the canton of Aargau. It lies on the range east of the Salhöhe Pass.

An antenna is located on the summit

References

External links
Wasserflue on Hikr

Mountains of Switzerland
Mountains of Aargau
Mountains of the Jura
Mountains of Switzerland under 1000 metres